Bogorodskoye is a rural locality (a selo) in Florishchinskoye Rural Settlement, Kolchuginsky District, Vladimir Oblast, Russia. The population was 21 as of 2010. There are 3 streets.

Geography 
Bogorodskoye is located 22 km northwest of Kolchugino (the district's administrative centre) by road. Ladozhino is the nearest rural locality.

References 

Rural localities in Kolchuginsky District